Lachman Singh was a leader of the Indian National Congress from Andaman and Nicobar Islands. He was nominated as Member of Parliament to 2nd Lok Sabha representing Andaman and Nicobar Islands the lower house of India's Parliament as a member of the Indian National Congress.

References

Nominated members of the Lok Sabha
Indian National Congress politicians
1906 births
People from Port Blair
Lok Sabha members from the Andaman and Nicobar Islands
Year of death missing